Dana Johanna Wortley is an Australian politician, representing the South Australian House of Assembly seat of Torrens for the South Australian Branch of the Australian Labor Party since the 2014 state election. She was previously a Labor Senator for South Australia from 2005 to 2011, elected to a six-year term at the 2004 federal election.

Early life
Wortley has a Bachelor of Education (Communication Studies) from the University of South Australia and a Diploma of Teaching from the Salisbury College of Advanced Education. She has previously been employed as a primary school teacher, a journalist and state secretary for the Media, Entertainment and Arts Alliance.

Politics
Wortley was placed winnable third on South Australian Labor's Senate ticket at the 2004 federal election and was elected, commencing her six-year term on 1 July 2005. She was again placed third on the ticket at the 2010 federal election but her re-election attempt was unsuccessful with only the first two candidates elected. Her term ended on 30 June 2011.

Wortley won the South Australian House of Assembly seat of Torrens at the 2014 state election. She is a member of the Public Works and Social Development committees.

Personal life
Wortley is married to fellow state Labor politician Russell Wortley. They have one son.  She is also a member of the Lions Club, and has stated this on her official Facebook profile.

References

External links
Parliamentary Profile: SA Parliament website
Parliamentary Profile: SA Labor website
Parliamentary Profile: Federal Parliament website

Living people
Australian Labor Party members of the Parliament of Australia
Members of the Australian Senate
Members of the Australian Senate for South Australia
University of South Australia alumni
Women members of the Australian Senate
Members of the South Australian House of Assembly
21st-century Australian politicians
21st-century Australian women politicians
Women members of the South Australian House of Assembly
Year of birth missing (living people)